Hildamit Lepcha is an exponent of Lepcha folk music. She is a recipient of Padma Shri Award in 2013. Hildamit has excelled as a performer of traditional Lepcha musical instruments as well as Lepcha songs.pagal se

Early life
Hildamit Lepcha was born in 1956 in Kalimpong in Darjeeling district of West Bengal.

References

1956 births
Living people
Indian women folk singers
Indian folk singers
Recipients of the Padma Shri in arts
People from Kalimpong district
20th-century Indian women singers
20th-century Indian singers
21st-century Indian singers
21st-century Indian women singers
Women musicians from West Bengal
Singers from West Bengal
Lepcha people